Štrihovec is a settlement in the Slovene Hills in the Municipality of Šentilj in northeastern Slovenia.

References

External links
Štrihovec on Geopedia

Populated places in the Municipality of Šentilj